"Said It All" is a song by English vocal group Take That. It is the fourth single from to be taken from their fifth studio album, The Circus (2008). The single was released in the United Kingdom on 15 June 2009, where it peaked at number nine on the UK Singles Chart and number one on the Scottish Singles Chart. It was their last hit as a four-piece as Robbie Williams return to the group on the next hit, "The Flood".

Song information
"Said It All" was written by band members Gary Barlow, Howard Donald, Jason Orange and Mark Owen, together with Steve Robson. It was released on 15 June 2009 in the UK. It features Barlow and Owen on lead vocals. The B-side, "Throwing Stones", has Owen take the lead vocals.

Critical reception

Digital Spy's Alex Fletcher described the song as a "swirling mega-ballad with a killer key change."

Chart performance
The single entered the UK Singles Chart at number 74 based on downloads alone, two weeks before the physical release date. "Said It All" peaked at number nine in its third week on the chart, becoming the band's 18th top 10 single in the UK. "Said It All" debuted at number one on the Scottish Singles Chart, becoming the band's eighth number one in that country and their only number-one single that didn't also reach the top spot on the UK Singles Chart. In Ireland the song peaked at number 17 the week of the single's release date.

Music video
The official music video for "Said It All" was premiered on Monday 11 May 2009. 
The video sees the four band members dressed as clowns preparing for a circus performance. It was directed by Lindy Heymann, who has also worked on videos for Faithless and Suede.

The four members did their own unicycle work after heavy preparation.

Personnel
Gary Barlow – co-lead vocals, backing vocals
Mark Owen – co-lead vocals, backing vocals
Howard Donald – backing vocals
Jason Orange – backing vocals

Track listings
UK CD single 1
 "Said It All" – 4:15
 "Throwing Stones" – 3:19

UK CD single 2
 "Said It All" – 4:15
 "Rule the World" (live) – 5:16
 "Julie" (live) – 4:35

UK DVD single
 "Said It All" (video) – 3:56
 "Said It All" (Making of the Video)

Charts

Weekly charts

Year-end charts

Certifications

References

2008 songs
2009 singles
Take That songs
Pop ballads
Rock ballads
Songs written by Gary Barlow
Songs written by Mark Owen
Songs written by Jason Orange
Songs written by Howard Donald
Songs written by Steve Robson
Music videos directed by Lindy Heymann
Number-one singles in Scotland